Edgar Everaert (born in Bruges, Belgium) was the founder of Club Deportivo Guadalajara.

Everaert arrived in Mexico in 1904 and obtained a job at the store Casa Comercial L. Gas y Cía. where he met Calixto Gas, a Mexican of French origin and with the help of Rafael, who worked at the Fábricas de Francia store, and others founded the football team Club Unión. According to the official version the colors of the team's uniform (red, white and blue) were influenced by the Flag of France but some people think that it was actually influenced by the Flag of Bruges which red and white stripes show a stronger correspondence with the team's jersey than the French flag does. Club Unión was later renamed Guadalajara.

References

C.D. Guadalajara
Belgian emigrants to Mexico
Sportspeople from Bruges
Year of birth missing
Year of death missing